Raphitoma lineolata is a species of sea snail, a marine gastropod mollusk in the family Raphitomidae.

The subspecies Raphitoma lineolata fuscata Nordsieck, 1977 is a synonym of Raphitoma lineolata (B.D.D, 1883)

Description
The teleoconch consists of 5 convex whorls, with conspicuous suture. The axial sculpture consists of 19 ribs slightly leaning backwards, and interspaces of the same width as the ribs. The spiral sculpture on the body whorl consists of 18 cordlets, of which 8 above the aperture, with interspaces wider (×1.5) than the cordlets. The cancellation is rectangular, with small and elongated tubercles at the intersection of axials and spirals. The tubercles on the adapical cordlets of the first whorls are narrow and spinulose. The sculpture is visible in transparency throughout the internal shell wall. The anal sinus is conspicuous, corresponding to two spiral cordlets. The columella is simple, slightly sinuous anteriorly, gently angled posteriorly. The outer lip shows 11 strong inner denticles. The anteriormost, weakest, delimit the siphonal canal and the posteriormost delimit the anal sinus. The siphonal canal is short, widely open and slightly curved. The ground colour of the shell is orange-tawny, with lighter cordlets and rare white tubercles. On the first teleoconch whorl there are two white axials . On the body whorl, the eighth abapical cordlet becomes lighter toward the peristome, with some white spots. Then two axials closest to the peristome are white on the central part.

Distribution
Entire Mediterranean and NE Atlantic

References

 Pusateri F., Giannuzzi-Savelli R. & Oliverio M. 2013. A revision of the Mediterranean Raphitomidae 2: On the sibling species Raphitoma lineolata (B.D.D., 1883) and Raphitoma smriglioi n. sp. Iberus, 31(1): 11-20
 Giannuzzi-Savelli R., Pusateri F. & Bartolini S., 2018. A revision of the Mediterranean Raphitomidae (Gastropoda: Conoidea) 5: loss of planktotrophy and pairs of species, with the description of four new species. Bollettino Malacologico 54, Suppl. 11: 1-77

External links
 Bucquoy E., Dautzenberg P. & Dollfus G. (1882-1886). Les mollusques marins du Roussillon. Tome Ier. Gastropodes. Paris, J.B. Baillière & fils 570 p., 66 pl.
 Terlizzi, A.; Scuderi, D.; Fraschetti, S.; Anderson, M. J. (2005). Quantifying effects of pollution on biodiversity: a case study of highly diverse molluscan assemblages in the Mediterranean. Marine Biology. 148, 293-305
 
 Gastropods.com: Raphitoma lineolata
 Biolib.cz: Raphitoma lineolata
 Natural History Museum, Rotterdam: Raphitoma lineolata

lineolata
Gastropods described in 1883